Hosh Bajed or Hawsh Bajed (Arabic: (تلال الأرز)حوش بجد) is a Syrian village in the Al-Zabadani District of the Rif Dimashq Governorate. According to the Syria Central Bureau of Statistics (CBS), Hosh Bajed had a population of 604 in the 2004 census.

References

External links

Populated places in Al-Zabadani District